Dolgeville Airport  is a privately owned, public use airport in Fulton County, New York, United States. It is one nautical mile (2 km) northeast of the central business district of Dolgeville, a village located in Fulton County and Herkimer County.

Facilities and aircraft 
Dolgeville Airport covers an area of 10 acres (4 ha) at an elevation of 945 feet (288 m) above mean sea level. It has one runway designated 11/29 with a turf surface measuring 1,360 by 100 feet (415 x 30 m).

For the 12-month period ending July 22, 2009, the airport had 44 aircraft operations: 68% general aviation and 32% military.

References

External links 
 Aerial image as of May 1995 from USGS The National Map
 

Defunct airports in New York (state)
Airports in New York (state)
Transportation in Fulton County, New York